John Warren (8 February 1873 – 31 December 1900) was a South African cricketer. He played three first-class matches for Border in 1897/98.

References

External links
 

1873 births
1900 deaths
People from Amahlathi Local Municipality
Cape Colony people
White South African people
South African people of British descent
South African cricketers
Border cricketers